Spermatogenesis associated serine rich 1 (SPATS1) is a protein which in humans is encoded by the SPATS1 gene. It is also known by the aliases Dishevelled-DEP domain interacting protein (DDIP), Spermatogenesis Associated 8 (SPATA8), and serin-rich spermatogenic protein 1 (SRSP1). A general idea of its chemical structure, subcellular localization, expression, and conservation is known. Research suggests SPATS1 may play a role in the canonical Wnt Signaling pathway and in the first spermatogenic wave.

Gene 
The human SPATS1 gene contains 1150 nucleotides, coding  for 300 amino acids. It's located on the positive strand of chromosome 6 in the 21p1 region. As of now there are no known single nucleotide polymorphisms (SNPs) that prove to be clinically significant.

Protein

Structure 
The protein in its longest form has 8 exons. There is another possible isoform, but experimental confirmation is lacking – possibly due to it being produced at low levels because of an immature stop codon. Bioinformatic analysis suggests that the protein does not have transmembrane structure and is composed of both alpha helixes and beta sheets. There have been conflicting numbers for SPATS1 isoelectric points. Several sources have said 6.68, while two others suggested that it is higher, 7.04 and 7.47.

Subcellular location 
Studies have suggested that most of the expression is found in the cytoplasm of the cell, but there is also evidence of expression in the nucleus. Expression in the nucleus may be supported by the fact that the rat homolog of the SPATS1 gene was experimentally found to have a probable bipartite nuclear localization signal. In addition, bioinformatic tools have identified a bipartite nuclear localization signal with high probability in the human protein at amino acids 174 - 191.

Post-translational modifications 
Bioinformatic analysis suggests that it undergoes several post-translational modifications. The more plausible ones propose a GPI – modification site at amino acid 280, N-glycosylation sites at amino acids 49 and 229, and a phosphorylation site at amino acid 113. There are 85 predicted sites of phosphorylation, 23 having an 80% or higher likelihood. Only the one located at amino acid 113 has been experimentally confirmed. There is also a high probability of a SASRP1 motif that spans amino acids 51 - 288.

Protein interactions 
Possible interacting proteins are listed in the table below. Note that these proteins have not been experimentally confirmed to interact with SPATS1. Instead, their interaction potential was determined by looking

at concurrence patterns and textmining.

Expression

Regulation 
The expression of this protein has been found to greatly decline in adulthood, compared to expression levels measured in fetuses. Studies have shown some fluctuation during the gestation period, but overall remaining relatively high. There has also been evidence of high expression levels up until day 28 postpartum.

Location 
Expression of this protein has been found in peritubular myoid cells, gonocytes, pachytene spermatocytes, spermatogonia, myoid cells, and Sertoli cells.
Mouse brains have shown expression in various areas of the brain including the pituitary gland, the prefrontal cortex, the frontal lobe, the cerebellum, and the parietal lobe. Highest expression levels have been found in the testes, the next highest levels being found in the trachea. A protein abundance histogram, which compares the abundance of a desired protein to other proteins, shows that SPATS1 is on the lower level of expression.

Function 
The specific function of SPATS1 is still being studied. Research has indicated that it may play a role in initiation of the first spermatogenic wave as well as the first male meiotic division. Another study suggests that it acts as a negative regulator in the canonical Wnt signaling pathway. Several microaary studies have studied the effects of knocking out different proteins and enzymes and the resulting effects on SPATS1 expression. Epigentic factors, specifically histone methylation, have also been looked at. The effects of knockout on phenotypes have also been done in several studies.

Conservation 
SPATS1 protein is conserved in species as early as Oxytricha trifallax. No orthologues have been found for this protein in archaea or bacteria. Nor have orthologs been found in birds. There is a high level of conservation among mammals and other close orthologs in the coding region. There is conservation among distant orthologs in non-coding regions, including the promoter, 5' UTR, and 3' UTR. These conservations are kept through either the same nucleotide, or a chemically similar nucleotide. Below is a table of orthologs along with the percent similarity and their date of divergence.

References